"Prisoner" is a song by Canadian singer the Weeknd, featuring American singer-songwriter Lana Del Rey, from the former's second studio album Beauty Behind the Madness (2015). They co-wrote the song with Illangelo, who co-produced it with the Weeknd. It is the first of the five collaborations between the two artists, being followed by "Party Monster", from the Weeknd's third studio album Starboy (2016).

Commercial performance
"Prisoner" debuted at number 47 on the Billboard Hot 100 with 51,291 copies sold in its first week. The song also accrued 3.7 million US streams.

Live performances 
Del Rey and the Weeknd performed the song live together for the first time on December 9, 2015, at The Forum in Inglewood, California.

Critical reception 
Alex Kritselis of Bustle wrote, "The mid-tempo duet sounds exactly how you'd expect it to sound: dark, tortured, and a little bit over-the-top. Depending on how you feel about The Weeknd and Del Rey — two artists who share a flair for the dramatic — this either makes the track absolutely perfect or absolutely unlistenable. Personally, I'm digging it." In his review of the album, Rolling Stone Jon Dolan described the song as "a summit of luxuriant sadness" and "quite the slow-burning pity party". Chris DeVille of Stereogum called "Prisoner" "the most intriguing part" of Beauty Behind the Madness, and said the song "feels like an old Weeknd mixtape track, but with touches of Del Rey’s doomed noir glamor". Vulture Dee Lockett wrote, "Lana, the tortured lover, and the Weeknd, the addict, sound exactly as you’d expect on this bombastic morbid-pop-meets-lusty-R&B ballad. They croon about their respective sorrows: Lana wonders if Hollywood has poisoned her, while the Weeknd comes to grips with falling in love. For most people, that last one would be a relief, but for someone who previously bragged, “I just fucked two bitches before I saw you,” it’s like living out a horror film. But they each agree that whatever pain they’re in, they brought it on themselves: “I’m addicted to a life that’s so empty and so cold / I’m a prisoner to my decisions,” they whine in tandem. Of course, it ends with a Lana soliloquy."

In 2019, Billboard Kirsten Spruch included "Prisoner" in her list of Del Rey's best collaborations. In his 2019 list of "Every Lana Del Rey Song, Ranked", Richard S. He of Billboard ranked the song number 75.

Charts

Weekly charts

Year-end charts

Certifications

References

2015 songs
The Weeknd songs
Lana Del Rey songs
Pop ballads
Contemporary R&B ballads
Song recordings produced by Illangelo
Song recordings produced by the Weeknd
Songs written by Illangelo
Songs written by Lana Del Rey
Songs written by the Weeknd
2010s ballads